The Arjuna Award, officially known as the Arjuna Awards for Outstanding Performance in Sports and Games, is a sports honour of the Republic of India. It is awarded annually by the Ministry of Youth Affairs and Sports. Before the introduction of the Rajiv Gandhi Khel Ratna in 1991–1992, the Arjuna Award was the highest sporting honour of India.

Name
The award is named after Arjuna, a character from the Sanskrit epic Mahabharata of ancient India. He is one of the Pandavas, depicted as a skilled archer winning the hand of Draupadi in marriage. In the Kurukshetra War, Lord Krishna becomes his charioteer teaching him the sacred knowledge of Gita. In Hindu mythology, he has been seen as a symbol of hard work, dedication and concentration.

History
Instituted in 1961 to honour the outstanding sportspersons of the country, the award over the years has undergone a number of expansions, reviews, and rationalizations. The award was expanded to include all the recognised disciplines in 1977, has introduced indigenous games and physically handicapped categories in 1995 and introduced a lifetime contribution category in 1995 leading to creation of a separate Dhyan Chand Award in 2002. The latest revision in 2018 stipulates that the award is given only to the disciplines included in the events like Olympic Games, Paralympic Games, Asian Games, Commonwealth Games, World Championship and World Cup along with Cricket, Indigenous Games, and Parasports. It also recommends giving only fifteen awards in a year, relaxing in case of excellent performance in major multi-sport events, team sports, across gender and giving away of at least one award to the physically challenged category.

The nominations for the award are received from all government-recognised National Sports Federations, the Indian Olympic Association, the Sports Authority of India (SAI), the Sports Promotion and Control Boards, the state and the union territory governments and the Rajiv Gandhi Khel Ratna, Arjuna, Dhyan Chand and Dronacharya awardees of the previous years. The recipients are selected by a committee constituted by the Ministry and are honoured for their "good performance in the field of sports over a period of four years" at international level and for having shown "qualities of leadership, sportsmanship and a sense of discipline".

Recipients
A total of 95 individual awards were presented in the 1960s: twenty in 1961, followed by nine in 1962, seven in 1963, seven in 1964, seven in 1965, thirteen in 1966, fifteen in 1967, seven in 1968, and ten in 1969. Individuals from twenty-one different sports were awarded, which include thirteen from hockey, twelve from athletics, eight from football, seven each from cricket and wrestling, six from weightlifting, five each from badminton and table tennis, four each from basketball, boxing, lawn tennis and swimming, three each from golf, polo and shooting, two each from squash and volleyball, and one each from billiards & snooker, chess and gymnastics. In an unusual move, the first and only team award to date was presented to the entire team of twenty mountaineers in 1965 representing the successful Indian Everest expedition of 1965.

Amongst the notable winners was Manuel Aaron, awarded in 1961. He was India's first chess International Master (IM). He obtained the title in 1961 and India did not produce a second IM for the next seventeen years. He dominated the chess in India, becoming national champion nine times between 1959 and 1981. Hockey players Charanjit Singh and Shankar Lakshman were awarded in 1963 and 1964 respectively. The former was the captain of the gold winning Indian men's hockey team at 1964 Summer Olympics at Tokyo. The latter was the goalkeeper of the Indian team in the 1956, 1960 and 1964 Olympics, helping the team win two gold medals and one silver medal.

List of recipients 

An Indian postage stamp (pictured) commemorated Indian's first successful Everest Expedition in 1965 (awarded team award in 1965). Avtar Singh Cheema and Nawang Gombu as seen here reached the summit in the morning of 19 May 1965. India in a single expedition placed nine men on the top of Everest, an unbroken record for the next 17 years.

Explanatory notes

References

External links
 Official website

 
Indian sports trophies and awards
Lists of Indian award winners